Prip is a surname. Notable people with the surname include:

 Henrik Prip (born 1960), Danish actor
 John Prip (1922–2009), American metalsmith, industrial designer, and educator
 Louka Prip (born 1997), Danish footballer
 Yadira Guevara-Prip (born 1995), American stage and television actress